Carpathonesticus parvus  is a species of araneomorph spider of the family Nesticidae. It occurs in Bosnia-Hercegovina, where it is found in caves. It was originally described from a single female specimen.

Description
Carpathonesticus parvus has a pale yellowish prosoma and appendages. The opisthosoma is pale brownish. Prosoma length is 0.75–0.9 mm in female and 0.87 mm in male specimens; prosoma width is 0.60 mm in females and 0.81 mm in males.

Original publication

References 

Nesticidae
Spiders of Europe
Spiders described in 1914